Spilomyia ephippium is a species of Hoverfly in the family Syrphidae.

Distribution
Mexico.

References

Eristalinae
Insects described in 1875
Taxa named by Carl Robert Osten-Sacken
Diptera of North America
Hoverflies of North America